The Miami-Dade Aviation Department (MDAD) is an agency of the Miami-Dade County government that manages airports. As of 2021 Ralph Cutié is the interim director of the agency. The Arts and Cultural Affairs division was created, and is managed by, Yolanda Sanchez. MDAD operates Miami International Airport, a passenger airport, and four general aviation airports. The other airports are Miami-Opa Locka Executive Airport, Miami Executive Airport, Miami Homestead General Aviation Airport, and Dade-Collier Training and Transition Airport. The executive offices are located at Miami International Airport.

References

External links

Miami-Dade International Airport and Miami-Dade Aviation Department

Airport operators of the United States
Government of Miami-Dade County, Florida
Transportation in Miami-Dade County, Florida